Dennis the Menace in Mayday for Mother is a 1981 animated TV movie. It was produced by DePatie–Freleng Enterprises. It is based on Hank Ketcham's 1951 comic strip. This was the first time Dennis the Menace was animated. The storyline was written by Ketcham.

In the special, it's Mother's Day and Dennis has not decided what to give his mother for a gift.

Cast 
The voice cast includes:
 Dennis Mitchell: Joey Nagy
 Alice Mitchell: Kathy Garver
 Henry Mitchell: Bob Holt
 George Wilson: Larry D. Mann
 Martha Wilson: Elizabeth Kerr
 Margaret: Nicole Eggert

Credits 
 Created and written for television by Hank Ketcham
 Produced by David H. DePatie and Friz Freleng
 Directors: Bob Richardson, David Detiege, Cullen Houghtaling, Art Leonardi, Nelson Shin, Art Vitello
 Layout: Ric Gonzalez, Martin Strudler
 Animation by: Dong Seo Animation
 Voices of: Nicole Eggert, Kathy Garver, James Hackett, Bob Holt, Elizabeth Kerr, Larry D. Mann, Joey Nagy, Herbert Rudley, Seth Wagerman, Nancy Wible
 Music composed by Joe Raposo
 Conducted by Eric Rogers
 In charge Of production: Lee Gunther
 Production managers: Kathy Condon, Steven Hahn
 Film editor: Robert Gillis
 Music editor: Joe Siracusa
 Production company: DePatie–Freleng Ent., Inc. in association with Mirisch Films, Inc.

References

External links 
 

American animated television films
Films scored by Joe Raposo
Television specials by DePatie–Freleng Enterprises
NBC television specials